AFC Croydon Athletic is a football club based in Thornton Heath in the London Borough of Croydon, England. They are affiliated to the London Football Association.

History
The club was formed in 2012 by fans of Croydon Athletic F.C. after that club withdrew from the Isthmian League during the 2011–12 season and eventually folded. Prior to their resignation, the club's owner Mazhar Majeed had been jailed following his involvement in the Pakistan cricket spot-fixing scandal, Majeed had been recorded admitting that he had purchased the club solely in order to launder money, and the club had been locked out of its ground by the local council due to unpaid debts.

The new club joined Division One of the Combined Counties League for the 2012–13 season. In their first season they finished eighth and won the Division One cup, beating Staines Lammas 5–0 in the final. They finished seventh the following season and were runner-up in 2014–15, earning promotion to level eight of the pyramid. Rather than entering the Premier Division of the Combined Counties League, they were transferred into the Southern Counties East League. The season also saw them win the London Senior Trophy, beating Interwood 4–3 after extra time. The first season in the Southern Counties East Football League saw them finish eleventh, their highest finish to date.

After four years at the club, manager Antony Williams left to join Chipstead in May 2016, and was replaced by Kevin Rayner. At the end of his first season in charge he led the team to their highest finish of seventh. At the end of the 2020–21 season the club were transferred to the Premier Division South of the Combined Counties League.

Ground
After its establishment the club were unable to continue playing at the former club's Mayfield Stadium, and so arranged to groundshare with Croydon F.C. at the Croydon Sports Arena. In January 2013 the Mayfield Stadium clubhouse was destroyed in a fire, but was rebuilt and the club moved to the ground in 2014, playing their first match there against Banstead Athletic on 15 November 2014.

Club officials

Managers
As of matches played 30 April 2021. All competitive matches are counted.

Honours
Combined Counties League
Division One Cup winners 2012–13
London Senior Trophy
Winners 2014–15

Records
Highest league position: 7th in Southern Counties East Football League, 2016–17
Best FA Cup performance: First qualifying round, 2018–19
Best FA Vase performance: Second round, 2018–19

See also
AFC Croydon Athletic players

References

External links
Official website

Fan-owned football clubs in England
Football clubs in England
Football clubs in London
Southern Counties East Football League
Combined Counties Football League
Association football clubs established in 2012
2012 establishments in England
Sport in the London Borough of Croydon
Phoenix clubs (association football)